Provincial Road 392 (PR 392) is a provincial road in the Canadian province of Manitoba.  It runs from an intersection with Highway 39 to an intersection at Poplar Avenue in Snow Lake. The route was first constructed in 1961, along with spurs to Osborne Lake and Chisel Lake. The route was designated in 1966, along with PR 393 and PR 395 running from the Canadian National Railway station at Wekusko to Snow Lake. The route was truncated in 1994 back to Highway 39 and the stretch from Highway 39 to Wekusko station was re-designated as PR 596.

Route description 
PR 392 begins at an intersection with Highway 39 in the town of Snow Lake. A two-lane gravel road, PR 392 runs northward past a western tributary of Wekusko Lake. The route winds northward, paralleling the shore of Tramping Lake into a large curve along Wekusko shoreline. During the curve, PR 392 bends northwest and enters Wekusko Falls Provincial Park. The route crosses a tributary of Tramping Lake that drains into Wekusko Lake. The route bends westward past an intersection with two dirt roads before turning northeastward along Wekusko Lake.

Leaving the shores of Wekusko Lake, PR 392 turns northward and into an intersection with the western terminus of PR 393, which connects to Osborne Lake. The route passes west of the community of Stall Lake. The route bends northwestward into an intersection with the eastern end of PR 395, a connection to Chisel Lake. PR 392 crosses a tributary of Snow Lake, and turns westward along the shoreline, entering the center of the town of Snow Lake. The route intersects with Lakeshore Drive, which connects the southern section of Snow Lake. Paralleling Wekusko Drive, PR 392 turns northwestward and reaches an intersection with Poplar Avenue. Provincial maintenance ends at this intersection, marking the end of PR 392, which continues as Cedar Avenue through Snow Lake.

History 
The segments that would later become part of PR 392 was completed as a gravel road from modern-day Highway 39 to the current terminus in Snow Lake. A portion of modern-day Highway 39 was a gravel road, as well as a spur to the Canadian National Railway's station at Wekusko. PR 392 was designated onto the segments from Wekusko station to Snow Lake in 1966, along with spurs that became PR 393 and PR 395. A concurrency was also added with PR 391, which was designated in 1966 as well.

In 1987, the designation of PR 391 was truncated back to Thompson and replaced with Highway 39. The concurrency with PR 392 remained however, connecting Wekusko and Snow Lake. In 1994, the designation of PR 392 was truncated back to Snow Lake and Highway 39 and the stretch to Wekusko station was re-christened as PR 596.

Junction list

References

External links 
Manitoba Infrastructure and Transportation website

392